Fatkullino (Fätqulla) is a rural locality (a village) in Ulu-Telyaksky Selsoviet, Iglinsky District, Bashkortostan, Russia. The population was 48 as of 2010. There is 1 street.

Geography 
Fatkullino is located 50 km east of Iglino (the district's administrative centre) by road. Ulu-Telyak is the nearest rural locality.

References 

Rural localities in Iglinsky District